Nizhnyaya Baygora is a rural locality (a selo) and the administrative center of Nizhnebaygorskoye Rural Settlement, Verkhnekhavsky District, Voronezh Oblast, Russia. The population was 575 as of 2010. There are 11 streets.

Geography 
Nizhnyaya Baygora is located 14 km north of Verkhnyaya Khava (the district's administrative centre) by road. Verkhnyaya Baygora is the nearest rural locality.

References 

Rural localities in Verkhnekhavsky District